Maryland gubernatorial elections have been held since statehood in 1867 to directly elect the Governor of Maryland and the officers that work with the winner candidate.

After the initial election was held in November 5 1867, when Oden Bowie became the first Governor of Maryland, each subsequent election was held every four years in November.

The candidates for the elections are previously selected in July of the same year in the Primary elections in Maryland, but the difference with the primaries is that in the General election voters can select candidates from any party since all parties are present in the voters ballot.

Process 
During Maryland gubernatorial elections  are elected the State Offices, Federal Offices and County Offices, in each one of them are elected their primary staff.

State Offices 
 Governor
 Lt. Governor
 Comptroller
 Attorney General
 State Senator
 House of Delegates
 Judge of the Circuit Court
 Judges of the Court of Special Appeals - For retention in office. 
 Judges of the Court of Appeals - For retention in office.

Federal Offices 
 United States Senator
 Representatives in Congress

County Offices 
 County Executive
 County Council / Commissioner
 County Treasurers
 State’s Attorney
 Clerk of the Circuit Courts
 Register of Wills
 Judges of the Orphan’s Court
 Sheriff
 Board of Education for each county: Allegany, Anne Arundel, Baltimore County, Calvert, Caroline, Carroll, Cecil, Charles, Dorchester, Frederick, Garrett, Harford, Howard, Kent, Montgomery, Prince George’s, Queen Anne’s, St. Mary’s, Somerset, Talbot, Washington, Wicomico and Worcester County. Voters can cast one votes for every district in their county.

Political parties in Maryland
There are four political parties in Maryland:
 Libertarian Party of Maryland
 Maryland Democratic Party
 Maryland Green Party
 Maryland Republican Party

On primary elections can be elected candidates of Maryland Democratic Party and Maryland Republican Party. On general elections can be elected candidates of the four political parties in Maryland.

Voting process

Voter registration
Voters can register in MVA offices and also with officers in public places such libraries, early voting centers and some schools and is necessary only to be done once, if a voter registered for a primary election does not need to register again for the Gubernatorial election and does not need an ID in order to vote after the voter is registered in the system.

Polling place
Polling place is specific to each voter according their address, polling place can be looked up on Maryland's State Board of election website, in current election it is accessible from the voting menu and the bottom Polling Place Locator where user is asked to enter its house number or building address, and also its street and zip code. Are early voting centers of each county for early voters and on election day it is only the voter designated polling place, that can be a school or a library, the polling place can be reviewed on the Maryland State Board of Elections website.

Early vote
Early votes can assist to voting centers from two Thursdays before the primaries and until one Thursday prior primary elections from 10 am until 8 pm, voters can assist to voting centers from two Thursdays before the general elections until one Thursday prior general elections from 10 am until 8 pm,.

Maryland's congressional districts

The elections are held to elect the candidates in each of the 8 Maryland's congressional districts:

 Maryland's 1st congressional district
 Maryland's 2nd congressional district
 Maryland's 3rd congressional district
 Maryland's 4th congressional district
 Maryland's 5th congressional district
 Maryland's 6th congressional district
 Maryland's 7th congressional district
 Maryland's 8th congressional district

Primary election day

Primary elections are held on last Tuesday of June, five months before general elections are held. Only democrat and republican voters allowed to vote on primary elections, voters of other parties are not allowed to vote on primaries.

General election day
General election day is the first Tuesday of the month, on this day are elected Maryland offices, Federal offices, county offices. On general elections, electors can vote for or against constitutional state wide amendments or county wide projects.

Ballot
The ballot is specific to the address of voters, so there are different ballots for each of the counties in Maryland; in fact, each county could have more than 50 different ballots. Sample ballots are available on the Maryland website on the 2018 Primary Election Proofing Ballots section.

Also will be able to see the "My Candidate Information" section with all the options for vote, among other information, and also will be also to see their specific sample ballot as a PDF file in order to take a better selection researching more on the biography and careers weeks or months before assisting to vote allowing a better election. 

Each voter will have an assigned ballot that will be according its address, it can be reviewed online in English and Spanish in the State Board of Elections website, where entering the voter first and last name, date of birth and zip code, and the elector will be able to see its options, that are the following:

 Precinct
 Congressional District
 Legislative District
 Councilman District
 Circuit Court District
 Appellate circuit court
 Central Committee
 Election District
 School
 And Senatorial district.

Voters also will be able to see the "My Candidate Information" section with all the options for vote, among other information, and also will be also to see their specific sample ballot as a PDF file in order to take a better selection researching more on the biography and careers weeks or months before assisting to vote allowing a better election.

Voter look-up website 
Voter look-up website is the official website for voters to find their voters information. In order to access to their information each voter must enter their first name, last name, day of birth and the zip code that appear in their id.

The information that voters can access in the Voter look-up website is the followed:

 My Voter Registration Record: This include the requirement or not of shown an ID in order to vote, Voter name, Voter address, Party affiliation, Registration day
 Polling Place Address and Directions 
 My Voting Districts 
 My Candidate Information
 My Ballot Questions 
 Local Board of Elections information 
 Sample ballot: If the sample ballot is not accessible, voters can access  the book of general election ballots specific for their county and look for their voting districts in order to find their ballot.

Vote in the polling place
When electors assist to the polling place are directed to reception area where personal ask to the elector its last name and first name, address and day and month of birthday, after it print a receipt and ask the voter to sign the receipt and instruct to go to the ballot dispensing table, where the voter receive the ballot, that contents three or more ballots, two for elect personal and the other ballot for or against amendments.

After receive the ballot the voter select their candidates with a black pen on the tables and in early votes go to one of the machines for capture the ballot information and where personal receive and staple in order of reception all the voters received. In early voting centers each polling places has more than five voting machines, on day of elections each voting center has only one voting machine.

Information about the candidates
The information about whom are the candidates running for office can be found in the Gubernatorial Candidate Listings of the Maryland State Board of Elections, also in the League of Women Voters website and in the Maryland Apple Ballot (funded by  National Education Association Advocacy Fund).

Turnout
Number of electors in Maryland in 2018 is 3,931,730 and is projected a turnout of around 50% (2,000,000 voters) with an expected abstention of 50% of electors.

List of Maryland elections since the Civil War 
The following is a list of elections for the position of Governor of Maryland since the American Civil War.

Winners are in bold and incumbents are denoted by asterisks.

Current Maryland election 
The present Maryland gubernatorial elections process is the 2022 Maryland gubernatorial election.

Election results by year

2018
The 2018 Maryland gubernatorial election was held on November 6, 2018.

Larry Hogan / Boyd Rutherford (Republican) - 1,275,644 (55.4%)
Ben Jealous / Susan Turnbull (Democratic) - 1,002,639 (43.5%)
Shawn Quinn / Christina Smith (Libertarian) - 13,241 (0.6%)
Ian Schlakman / Annie Chambers (Green) - 11,175 (0.5%)
Write-ins - 1,813 (0.1%)

2014
The 2014 Maryland gubernatorial election was held on November 4, 2014.

Larry Hogan / Boyd Rutherford (Republican) - 884,400 (51.03%)
Anthony Brown / Ken Ulman (Democratic) - 818,890 (47.25%)
Shawn Quinn / Lorenzo Gaztañaga (Libertarian) - 25,382 (1.46%)
Write-ins - 4,505 (0.26%)

2010
The 2010 Maryland gubernatorial election was held on November 2, 2010.

Martin O'Malley / Anthony Brown (Democratic) - 1,043,724 (56.2%)
Bob Ehrlich / Mary D. Kane (Republican) - 775,661 (41.8%)
Susan Gaztañaga / Doug McNeil (Libertarian) - 14,124 (0.8%)
Allwine / Eidel (Green) - 11,809 (0.6%)
Knowles / Hargadon (Constitution) - 8,596 (0.5%)
Write-ins - 1,943 (0.1%)

2006
Martin O'Malley / Anthony Brown (D) - 942,279 (52.7%)
Bob Ehrlich / Kristen Cox (R) * - 825,464 (46.2%)
Ed Boyd / James Madigan (G) - 15,551 (0.9%)
Chris Driscoll / Ed Rothstein (P) - 3,481 (0.2%)

2002
Bob Ehrlich / Michael Steele (R) - 879,592 (51.55%)
Kathleen Kennedy Townsend / Charles R. Larson (D) - 813,422 (47.68%)
Spear Lancaster / Lorenzo Gaztañaga (L) - 11,546 (0.68%)

1998

 Parris Glendening / Kathleen Kennedy Townsend (D)* - 846,972 (55.17%)
 Ellen Sauerbrey / Richard D. Bennett (R) - 688,357 (44.83%)

1994

 Parris Glendening / Kathleen Kennedy Townsend (D) - 708,094 (50.21%)
 Ellen Sauerbrey / Paul Rappaport (R) - 702,101 (49.79%)

1990

 William Donald Schaefer / Melvin Steinberg (D)* - 664,015 (59.77%)
 William S. Shepard / Lois Shepard (R) - 446,980 (40.23%)

1986

 William Donald Schaefer / Melvin Steinberg (D) - 907,291 (82.37%)
 Thomas J. Mooney / Melvin Bilal (R) - 194,185 (17.63%)

1982

 Harry R. Hughes/ J. Joseph Curran Jr. (D)* - 705,910 (61.99%)
 Robert Pascal/ Newton Steers (R) - 432,826 (38.01%)

1978

 Harry R. Hughes/ Samuel W. Bogley (D) - 718,328 (70.98%)
 J. Glenn Beall Jr./ Aris T. Allen (R) - 293,635 (29.02%)

1974

 Marvin Mandel/ Blair Lee III (D)* - 602,648 (63.50%)
 Louise Gore/ Frank B. Wade (R) - 346,449 (36.50%)

1970

 Marvin Mandel/ Blair Lee III (D) - 639,579 (65.73%)
 C. Stanley Blair/ Herbert John "Jack" Miller Jr. (R) - 314,336 (32.30%)
 Robert Woods Merkle Sr./ Elbert G. Miller (American) - 19,184 (1.97%)

1966

 Spiro Agnew (R) - 455,318 (49.50%)
 George P. Mahoney (D) - 373,543 (40.61%)
 Hyman A. Pressman (I) - 90,899 (9.88%)

1962

 J. Millard Tawes (D)* - 428,071 (55.64%)
 Frank Small Jr. (R) - 341,271 (44.36%)

1958

 J. Millard Tawes (D) - 485,061 (63.55%)
 James Patrick Devereux (R) - 278,173 (36.45%)

1954

 Theodore R. McKeldin (R)* - 381,451 (54.46%)
 Harry C. Byrd (D) - 319,033 (45.54%)

1950

 Theodore R. McKeldin (R) - 369,807 (57.28%)
 William Preston Lane Jr. (D)* - 275,824 (42.72%)

1946

 William Preston Lane Jr. (D) - 268,084 (54.73%)
 Theodore R. McKeldin (R) - 221,752 (45.27%)

1942
Herbert R. O'Conor (D)* - 198,488 (52.55%)
Theodore R. McKeldin (R) - 179,204 (47.45%)

1938
Herbert R. O'Conor (D) - 308,372 (54.62%)
Harry Whinna Nice (R)* - 242,095 (42.88%)
Herbert Brune (I) - 7,503 (1.33%)
Joshua C. Gwin (Union) - 4,249 (0.75%)
David W. Eyman (Socialist) - 941 (0.17%)
Robert Kadish (Labor) - 759 (0.13%)
Samuel Gordon (Communist) - 616 (0.11%)

1934
Harry Whinna Nice (R) - 253,813 (49.52%)
Albert C. Ritchie (D)* - 247,664 (48.32%)
Broadus Mitchell (Socialist) - 6,773 (1.32%)
William A. Gillespe (I) - 2,831 (0.55%)
Bernard Ades (Communist) - 776 (0.15%)
Harry B. Galantian (Labor) - 719 (0.14%)

1930
Albert C. Ritchie (D)* - 283,639 (55.96%)
William F. Broening (R) - 216,864 (42.78%)
Elisabeth Gilman (Socialist) - 4,178 (0.82%)
Robert W. Stevens (Labor) - 1,358 (0.27%)
Samuel Parker (Communist) - 855 (0.17%)

1926
Albert C. Ritchie (D)* - 207,435 (57.93%)
Addison E. Mullikin (R) - 148,145 (41.37%)

1923
Albert C. Ritchie (D)* - 177,871 (55.97%)
Alexander Armstrong (R) - 137,471 (43.26%)

1919
Albert C. Ritchie (D) - 112,240 (49.06%)
Harry Whinna Nice (R) - 112,075 (48.99%)
Arthur L. Blessing (Socialist) - 2,799 (1.22%)

1915
Emerson C. Harrington (D) - 119,317 (49.57%)
Ovington E. Weller (R) - 116,136 (48.24%)

1911
Phillips Lee Goldsborough (R) - 106,392 (50.71%)
Arthur Pue Gorman Jr. (D) - 103,395 (49.29%)

1907
Austin Lane Crothers (D) - 102,051 (50.66%)
George R. Gaither Jr. (R) - 94,300 (46.81%)
James W. Frizzell (Prohibition) - 3,776 (1.87%)

1903
Edwin Warfield (D) - 108,548 (52.01%)
Stevenson A. Williams (R) - 95,923 (45.97%)
William Gisriel (Prohibition) - 2,913 (1.40%)

1899
John Walter Smith (D) - 128,409 (51.12%)
Lloyd Lowndes Jr. (R)* - 116,286 (46.29%)
James Swann (Prohibition) - 5,275 (2.10%)

1895
Lloyd Lowndes Jr. (R) - 124,936 (54.06%)
John E. Hurst (D) - 106,169 (45.94%)

1891
Frank Brown (D) - 108,539 (58.06%)
William J. Vannort (R) - 78,388 (41.94%)

1887
Elihu E. Jackson (D) - 99,038 (53.34%)
Walter B. Brooks (R) - 86,622 (46.66%)

1883
Robert M. McLane (D) - 92,694 (53.46%)
Hart B. Holton (R) - 80,707 (46.54%)

1879
William Thomas Hamilton (D) - 90,771 (56.95%)
James Albert Gary (R) - 68,609 (43.05%)

1875
John Lee Carroll (D) - 85,454 (54.09%)
James Morrison Harris (R) - 72,530 (45.91%)

1871
William Pinkney Whyte (D) - 73,958 (55.69%)
Jacob Tome (R) - 58,838 (44.31%)

1867
Oden Bowie (D) - 63,602 (74.40%)
Hugh Lennox Bond (R) - 21,890 (25.60%)

See also

 Governor of Maryland
 List of Governors of Maryland
 Elections in Maryland
 List of Maryland gubernatorial elections
 List of counties in Maryland
 Maryland's congressional districts (8)
 Maryland Senate
 Maryland House of Delegates (141 delegates for 47 districts)
 United States circuit court
 Maryland Circuit Courts
 List of current members of the Maryland House of Delegates
 List of current members of the Maryland Senate
 Maryland state budget
 List of Districts in the Maryland House of Delegates

Current elections
 Maryland gubernatorial election, 2022
 United States Senate election in Maryland, 2022
 United States House of Representatives elections, 2022

Sources 
Maryland State Board of Elections
Governor - History, OurCampaigns.com

References

 
Elections